Wesam Abu Rmila (born 10 December 1995) is a judoka from Palestine.

Career
Abu Rmilah took part in the 2013 World Judo Championships in Rio de Janeiro, and then qualified for the 2015 edition in Astana. He entered the 2018 Asian Games in Indonesia, the 2019 Asia-Oceania Championships in Abu Dhabi, and the 2017 Grand Prix in Antalya. He was chosen to compete in the Judo at the 2020 Summer Olympics – Men's 81 kg in Tokyo.

Personal life
Born in Jerusalem, his father had also competed in judo in Palestine and has acted as his coach. His brothers, Ahmed and Amr, have also represented their country in judoka.

References

External links
 

Living people
1995 births
Palestinian male judoka
Olympic judoka of Palestine
Judoka at the 2020 Summer Olympics
Asian Games competitors for Palestine
Judoka at the 2018 Asian Games
Sportspeople from Jerusalem